Maksymilian Małkowiak (September 26, 1922 in Gniezno – September 6, 2009) was a Polish field hockey player who competed in the 1952 Summer Olympics.

He was part of the Polish field hockey team, which competed in the 1952 Olympic tournament. He played as forward in the only match for Poland in the main tournament.

External links
 
profile 

1922 births
2009 deaths
Polish male field hockey players
Olympic field hockey players of Poland
Field hockey players at the 1952 Summer Olympics
People from Gniezno
Sportspeople from Greater Poland Voivodeship